Pig-Heart Boy is a children's novel by Malorie Blackman, which was first published in 1997. Described by the Guardian as 'A powerful story' it shows the life of a teenage boy with a viral heart transplant. It was shortlisted for the Carnegie Medal. The novel was adapted into a television series, which was broadcast by Children's BBC in 1999.

Plot
Thirteen-year-old Cameron Joshua Kelsey has a serious heart condition, and urgently needs a transplant. He has been given hope and turned down twice. So in desperation, Cameron's father secretly contacts Dr. Richard Bryce, a transgenics expert. Cameron, a.k.a. Cam, finds out through coming home early and discovering his parents arguing about it. Cameron's mother, Catherine, is not happy that his father arranged this without her being involved and does not want her son to have a pig's heart. Cameron decides he wants to see his fourteenth birthday, and the rest of his life, and thus chooses to have the transplant.

However, Cameron is sworn to secrecy about the nature of the transplant, but secretly he tells his best friend Marlon. Meanwhile, Cameron goes to see Trudy, the pig that will be donating a heart to Cameron. His mother announces she is pregnant because she does not want her baby to be damaged by the X-Ray needed to see the pigs. Cameron is delighted and proceeds to make recorded videos for his unborn sibling, in case he dies during the operation, which eventually goes ahead and is successful. But Cameron is furious when he discovers that Marlon has told his parents, who in turn have told the newspapers about the pig heart. Cameron is let out of hospital, but he is now famous and his family are constantly bothered by the media. Even worse, the girl Cameron likes does not want to be near him anymore because she thinks he has germs, and some animal rights protesters threaten him and his family. At some point in the book, Cameron is out with his friends (having made up with Marlon) joking about on their way to the burger shop. Then a friendly lady politely asks Cameron if his surname is Kelsey. Cameron trusts her and says yes, only for her to reveal she has a bucket of red liquid behind her back and hold it high above her head. Cameron knows what is coming and put his hands up in protest as she tips the liquid on him. He tastes the liquid and realises it is pig's blood. Marlon screams abuse and Cameron is taken to casualty.

Cameron has always liked swimming, and decides he is now fit enough, so he spends more time at the swimming pool, trying to touch the bottom like his friends did. He finally manages it, but gets trapped underneath the surface and accepts that he is going to drown. However, Marlon saves his life. Dr. Bryce tells Cameron that his new heart is being rejected by his body, and that he will need another transplant. Cameron refuses, as he is sick of the attention. However, when his grandmother dies, he realises that life is important, and he wants to be around for his younger brother or sister, whom he has decided to call Alex.

Reception     
Pig-Heart Boy gained favorable reviews.

BBC television version
In 1999, the BBC made a six-part television adaptation of the novel. Although the television adaptation was overall quite faithful to the book, some aspects were changed, including some characters' names (for example, Dr. Bryce is labelled Professor Rae in the television version), and also the fact that Cameron had not been the first patient to have had a pig transplant with Dr. Bryce/Professor Rae. The series also ended with Alex being born, while the book merely ends with Cameron's decision to accept the second heart transplant.

The television adaptation won the BAFTA Award for Children's Drama in 2000. It has never been released commercially, though the episodes are available to watch on YouTube.

References

External links

1997 British novels
1997 children's books
British children's novels
BBC children's television shows
1999 British television series debuts
1999 British television series endings
1990s British children's television series
Television shows based on children's books
English-language television shows
Corgi books